Fire and Ashes may refer to:

Books
Fire and Ashes, book on politics by Michael Ignatieff 2013
Fire and Ashes, book on forest fires by John N. Maclean 2003
Fire and Ashes, book on cricket by Duncan Hamilton (journalist) 2009

Film and TV
Fire and Ashes (film), 1961 Iranian film directed by Khosrow Parvizi
"Fire and Ashes", 1999 episode of British television series Heartbeat (Series 8, Episode 19)

Music
Fire & Ashes (EP), 2015 album by German symphonic metal band Xandria

See also
Ashes & Fire, 2011 album by Ryan Adams